Flight is the process by which an object moves without direct support from a surface.

Flight may also refer to:

Arts, entertainment, and media

Films
 Flight (1929 film), an American adventure film
 Flight (2009 film), a South Korean drama film
 Flight (2012 film), an American film directed by Robert Zemeckis and starring Denzel Washington
 Flight (2021 film), an Indian action thriller film

 The Flight (film), a 1970 Soviet film

Literature
 "Flight" (Lessing story), a 1957 short story by Doris Lessing
 Flight (novel), a 2007 novel by Sherman Alexie
 Flight (play), a 1927 by Mikhail Bulgakov
 "Flight" (Steinbeck story), a 1938 short story by John Steinbeck
 Flights (novel), a 2007 novel by Olga Tokarczuk

Music

Albums and EPs
 Flight (Building 429 album) (2002)
 Flight (Cesium 137 album) (2008)
 Flight (Thorgeir Stubø album) (1988)
 Flight, an album by Windsor Airlift (2010)
 The Flight [Lux], an EP by Edge of Dawn (2005)

Songs
 "Flight" (Lifehouse song) (2014)
 "Flight", a song by A Certain Ratio from The Graveyard and the Ballroom
 "Flight", a song by Neurosis from Souls at Zero

Other uses in music
 Flight (opera), an opera by Jonathan Dove (1998)
 Flights (band), a British rock band
 The Flight (band), a duo that produces music for film, television and video games

Television
 Flight (TV series), a 1958 syndicated anthology series hosted by George Kenney
 "Flight" (Grey's Anatomy), a 2012 episode of Grey's Anatomy
 "Flight" (Prison Break), a 2006 episode of Prison Break

Other uses in arts, entertainment, and media
 Flight (comics) (2005)
 Flight (magazine), a magazine founded in 1909
 Flight (sculpture), an artwork at the Lynden Sculpture Garden
 Microsoft Flight, a video game/simulation
 The Flight, a Marvel Comics superhero team of 1992

Military
 Flight (military unit)
 Flight sergeant, a senior non-commissioned rank in the Royal Air Force and several other air forces

Sports
 Flight (cricket), a sports term
 In flight, a condition before a batted ball has touched anything other than a fielder or their gear

Other uses
 Flight (advertising)
 Flight (horse), an Australian racehorse
 Fletching or flight, part of an arrow
 Flight of stairs
 Air travel
 A flight number designating an airline service
 Attachment used to move material in a flight conveyor
A beer flight, used to sample many different beers

See also
 Fight-or-flight response
 Flighting (disambiguation)
 Fly (disambiguation)
 Take Flight (disambiguation)